Wanless is an English surname, possibly meaning "hopeless" or "luckless".

Notable people with this surname include:
 Betty Wanless (1928–1995), American baseball player
 Derek Wanless (1947–2012), English banker
 Elizabeth Wanless (born 1981), American shot putter
 Ian Wanless (born 1969), Australian mathematician
 Neville Wanless (1931–2020), English broadcaster
 Paul Wanless (born 1973), English footballer
 Peter Wanless (born 1964), English civil servant
 Robert Wanless O'Gowan (1864–1947), British army officer
 Sarah Wanless, English ornithologist
 William James Wanless (1865–1933), Canadian medical missionary to India

References